Bi Zhong (born September 1, 1968) is a retired male hammer thrower from Dalian, PR China, who competed for his native country at the 1992 Summer Olympics in Barcelona, Spain.  He set the national record at 77.04 metres on August 4, 1989, at a meet in Jinggangshan City, Jiangxi.

Achievements

References 

Profile

1968 births
Living people
Chinese male hammer throwers
Athletes (track and field) at the 1992 Summer Olympics
Olympic athletes of China
Asian Games medalists in athletics (track and field)
Athletes (track and field) at the 1990 Asian Games
Athletes (track and field) at the 1994 Asian Games
Asian Games gold medalists for China
Medalists at the 1990 Asian Games
Medalists at the 1994 Asian Games
20th-century Chinese people